Chris Staples is an American indie rock musician originally from Pensacola, Florida, long based in Seattle, Washington. He released Panama, Burned and Blistered, Blackest Hair, Bluest Eyes, Badlands, and American Soft independently, before catching the attention of Seattle-based Barsuk Records, who re-released American Soft in 2014. Staples' second album on Barsuk, Golden Age, was released in 2016. His next album, Holy Moly, was released by Barsuk on June 28, 2019.

In addition to his solo career, Staples has performed with Telekinesis, Josh Tillman, Rocky Votolato, Jeremy Enigk, and David Bazan.

Previously, Staples wrote and released music as "Discover America". Early in his career, he was the vocalist and guitarist of the indie rock band Twothirtyeight.

Discography
 Panama
 Burned and Blistered
 Merci' Main 
 Blackest Hair, Bluest Eyes (2004)
 Badlands (2010)
 Faces - EP (2011)
 American Soft (2014)
 Golden Age (2016)
 Holy Moly (2019)

References

External links
Chris Staples' Pateron

American rock singers
American rock guitarists
American male guitarists
People from Pensacola, Florida
Living people
Year of birth missing (living people)
Barsuk Records artists